Pauli Salonen (14 February 1916, Hollola – 10 January 2009) was a Finnish nordic combined skier who competed during the 1940s. He finished seventh in the individual event at the 1948 Winter Olympics in St. Moritz, Switzerland.

Cross-country skiing results

Olympic Games

World Championships

External links
Winter Olympic nordic combined results: 1948-64
Pauli Salonen's profile at Sports Reference.com

1916 births
2009 deaths
People from Hollola
Finnish male cross-country skiers
Finnish male Nordic combined skiers
Cross-country skiers at the 1948 Winter Olympics
Nordic combined skiers at the 1948 Winter Olympics
Olympic cross-country skiers of Finland
Olympic Nordic combined skiers of Finland
Sportspeople from Päijät-Häme
20th-century Finnish people